is a Japanese romance shōjo manga series written and illustrated by Atsuko Nanba. A live action film adaptation was released on October 17, 2015.

Characters
Keigo Minohara (Jun Shison)
Rika Tsuzuki (Kyoko Yoshine)
Aoi Okita (Riria)

References

External links

2010s Japanese films
Live-action films based on manga
Kodansha manga
Manga adapted into films
Romance anime and manga
Shōjo manga